Rose Bruford College (formerly Rose Bruford College of Theatre & Performance) is a drama school in the south London suburb of Sidcup. The college has degree programmes in acting, actor musicianship, directing, theatre arts and various disciplines of stagecraft.

Its undergraduate and postgraduate qualifications and programmes were validated by the University of Manchester, until it received taught degree awarding powers in 2017. It is a member of the Federation of Drama Schools.

History
Rose Elizabeth Bruford established The Rose Bruford Training College of Speech and Drama in 1950, with the help of poet laureate John Masefield, and actors Laurence Olivier, and Peggy Ashcroft, who formed part of the Board of Governors. Rose Bruford "pioneered the first acting degree in 1976." The Kent Education Committee offered to lease to her Lamorbey House, an eighteenth-century, Grade II listed manor house in the Lamorbey district of Sidcup, for £5 per year. Grants helped sustain the college in its early years, and it eventually became profitable.

The campus has since been expanded. Construction of several new buildings was completed in 2002. The college's research facilities and archives include the Stanislavski Centre and the Clive Barker Library. Members or former members of its faculty serve as editors and/or on the editorial boards of such performing-arts journals as New Theatre Quarterly and Performance Prompt.

In 2014, The Stage reported that 91.6% of Rose Bruford students were from state schools. In the same year, Rose Bruford College scored an overall satisfaction rating of 90% in the National Student Survey.

Alumni

College alumnus Bernardine Evaristo, the 2019 Booker Prize winner, succeeded Richard Eyre as college president in 2021. Other alumni include Hayley Squires, Gary Oldman, Mathew Baynton, Tom Baker, Tom Hopper, Edward Peel, Lake Bell, Rosalie Craig, Giovanna Fletcher, Stephen Graham, Nick Darke, Sam Palladio, and Marc Duret.

See also
 Bird College

Notes

Further reading

External links
 

 
Higher education colleges in London
Drama schools in London
Educational institutions in the London Borough of Bexley
Educational institutions established in 1950
1950 establishments in England
Buildings and structures in Sidcup